Donald Stokes may refer to:
 Donald Stokes, Baron Stokes, English industrialist
 Donald E. Stokes, American political scientist